Echinops echinatus, the Indian globe thistle, commonly known as Usnakantaka, is a species of globe thistle, found in India, Pakistan, and Sri Lanka. Indian globe thistle is an erect branched herb about 100 cm high. It has short, stout stems, branching from the base, covered with white cottony hair. Alternately arranged oblong, deeply pinnatifid leaves are 7–12 cm long. Flower heads occur in solitary white spherical balls, 3–5 cm across. Petals of the tiny white disc florets are 5 mm long. Flowers are surrounded by straight, strong, white bristles. Often misidentified with Silybum marianum (L.) Gaertner, it is colloquially known as Camel's thistle.

Flowering
From December to January.

Chemistry

2',5,7- trihydroxy-3.6-dimethoxy flavone-7-O-b-D-galactopyranosyl-[1®4]-O-a-L-rhamnopyranoside is reported from the seeds of Echinops echinatus. 7-hydroxyisoflavone, kaempferol-4'-methylether, kaempferol-7-methylether, myricetin-3-O-a-L-rhamnoside, kaempferol and kaempferol-3-O-a-L-rhamnoside, are reported from the whole plant of Echinops echinatus.
 
An antiinflammatory active flavanone glycoside 5,7-dihydroxy-8,4'-dimethoxyflavanone-5-O-a-L-rhamnopyranosyl-7-O-b-D-arabinopyranosyl-(1®4)-O-b-D-glucopyranoside A along with a known compound dihydroquercetin-4'-Me ether is also reported from the leaves of Echinops echinatus.

Apigenin, apigenin 7-O-glucoside, and a new acylflavone glucoside named echitin (I) were isolated from Echinops echinatus flowers.

Echinopsidine, a potential MAOI,  is found in this species along with the related alkaloids echinopsine and echinozolinone.

References

 
 
Singh B, Gambhir SS, Pandey VB, Joshi VK. 1989. Anti-inflammatory activity of Echinops echinatus
Flowers of India, Indian Globe Thistle description and photos
Vashisth Pranav,, Jain Vinay, Mishra Priy , Bharadwaj Sudhir,  Agrawal Neha, Chokotia Love , Sikarwar Indu , Sironiya Rajkumar , Matoli Harsha. 2015. Echinops echinatus Roxb., a nature's drugstore, an overview. Indo-American Journal of Pharmaceutical Research
Manish Agrawal, Alok Nahata, Vinod Dixit. 2012. Protective effects of Echinops echinatus on testosterone-induced prostatic hyperplasia in rats. European Journal of Integrative Medicine 

echinatus
Medicinal plants
Flora of the Indian subcontinent
Plants described in 1832